Peter Lynn (born 1946) is a New Zealand kitemaker, engineer and inventor. He is notable for his construction of the world's largest kites (Guinness book of records holders), giant inflatable (sparless) display kites (the most widely known is the 27 m octopus kite), the popularisation of kite buggying and contributions to the development of power kiting and kitesurfing. He spends much of the year travelling worldwide and displaying his kites at International Kite Festivals.

Lynn, together with his wife Elwyn, established a kite business at Ashburton, New Zealand, in 1971, producing single-line kites for children. In 1974 he developed the Peter Lynn Triangular box kite, a framed triangular form cellular single line kite. Beginning in 1984 with the Centipede design, he then developed large creature-themed display kites for the growing number of international kite festivals. These large-scale sparless kites include the manta ray, octopus, puffer-fish, gecko and trilobite.

In 1987 he began developing power kites for traction uses,and designing boats, buggies, boards and snow sleds to use with them. The sport of kite buggying in its modern form began from a kitesailing craft he developed. It was equipped with three 'skis' and was quite unsuccessful on the water. In 1990 he converted it to a land buggy by replacing the skis with wheels. More than 10,000 of his buggies are now in use, and there are also many other kite buggy manufacturers. Kite buggying has become a popular worldwide sport.

In 1994 he developed the 'super-ripstop/thru cord' ram air kite construction system for large display and traction kites. This is a technique of strengthening ripstop nylon by sewing high-tech dacron or spectra/dyneema cord across the material, and providing an adjustable cross-sectional aerodynamic profile by the use of variable length cords rather than the fixed rib used in a conventional wing or ram-air parafoil such as a parachute.

In 1995 he designed the ram-air inflated Megabite, a 635 square metre kite. It was accepted as the world's largest kite by Guinness in 1997. When on the ground, more than 1000 people can comfortably stroll around inside it. He also designed the current Guinness record holder, a 1019 square metre Kuwait flag, which took over the world record from the Megabite in 2005. That same year, he built two additional identically sized kites (Mega Flag in the United States and Mega Moon in Japan), allowing for more exhibitions of the World's Largest Kites around the world.

In 1997 he developed the first 'hybrid' traction kite. It is referred to as hybrid as the form is a single skin kite supported by a combination of both aerodynamic forces and a flexible frame. Conventional traction kites use either a rigid frame inflated with a pump prior to launching or ram air inflated cavities.

In 1999 he developed the first bridleless arch style ram air kite, primarily for kitesurfing. Arc style kites are generally more efficient (better upwind performance) and are more resistant to luffing (more stable and reliable in gusty conditions) relative to leading edge inflatable (LEI) sled kites but have slightly lower lift coefficient (less power from the same size kite).

More recently he has developed the KiteSled (see image), for kite powered snow expeditioning. It steers by bending its skis, which are constructed from multiple longitudinal elements dovetailed together. Using KiteSleds, in May 2006 Australians Patrick Spiers and Ben Deacon completed a 700 km trans-Greenland journey that they believe was 20% faster than would have been possible by kite skiing. 

Lynn has also contributed to the theoretical underpinnings of kite flying through a series of scientific papers.

In other fields, his inventions include:

1975. The original 'tipping blade' portable sawmill system, using a single (circular) saw blade which rotates 90 degrees at the end of each pass through a log to enable the production of sawn timber in one operation. While he held the patent on this invention until 1980, after the patent lapsed it became the world standard portable sawmill system.

1987. Started Stirling Research Ltd, and with Dr. Donald Clucas began the development of a stirling cycle engine generator for yachts (and later for in-home combined heat and power systems). From 1991, Dr Clucas continued this development through to commercialisation with WhisperGen, a business formed for this purpose by elements of the NZ electricity industry.

Peter Lynn's father, Robert Frederick Lynn (1914–2012) was the founder of the Lynn Historic Woodworking Trust Inc. a collection of historic woodworking tools, equipment and archives, including the world's largest collection of ornamental turning lathes.  It is sited at The Plains, a colonial era museum park in Ashburton, NZ.  Robert Fredrick Lynn was awarded the Queen's Service Order in the New Years Honours list 2007.

Patents
 Traction kite design, filed April 2002, issued March 2006
 Ram air inflated wing, filed November 2002, issued January 2005

References

External links
 Peter Lynn's website
 Peter Lynn kites
 Peter Lynn Kiteboarding

1946 births
Living people
20th-century New Zealand inventors
New Zealand kite fliers
People from Ashburton, New Zealand
21st-century New Zealand engineers
20th-century New Zealand engineers